Bill or William Tobin may refer to:
Bill Tobin (baseball) (1854–1912), baseball player
Bill Tobin (American football) (born 1941), American football player 
Bill Tobin (ice hockey) (1895–1963), Canadian ice hockey player, executive and head coach
William Tobin (journalist) (1927–2009), American journalist
William Tobin (cricketer) (1859-1904), Australian cricketer
William Tobin (astronomer), British–New Zealand astronomer and academic
William J. Tobin, American entrepreneur and inventor
Liam Tobin, Irish intelligence officer and mutineer